Boutros Al-Hallaq (born 1966) is a Syrian politician. He currently serves as Information Minister in the Cabinet of Syria. He was sanctioned by the European Union in November 2021.

He worked as Vice President of Scientific Affairs at Damascus University in 2021, and as Dean of the Media College from 2013 to 2017.

References 

Living people
1966 births
Syrian ministers of information
21st-century Syrian politicians
Cairo University alumni